Jorge Rivera López (born 19 March 1934) is an Argentine actor of television and film.

Career 
During the 1980s military dictatorship, López, along with Luis Brandoni, Roberto Cossa, Osvaldo Dragún and Pepe Soriano, accompanied by Nobel Peace Prize winner (1980) Adolfo Esquivel and writer Ernesto Sábato formed a group called Teatro Abierto (Open Theater) in an attempt to reinvent independent theater separated from government propaganda and approval. Despite threats, they opened with the declaration that they were against dictatorship and government intervention in the arts. On the opening night, Rivera López read the “Declaration of the Principles” claiming for all the participants their right to freedom of opinion and expression. Three works per day were presented for a full week in the Tabaris Theatre, to an estimated audience of 25,000. The movement continued to perform, despite government disapproval, until the return to democracy, and for several years afterwards presented works critical of the abuses of the dictatorship.

Works

Theater 
 ¡Ay, Carmela! (1989)

Film 
 Pobres habrá siempre (1958)... Eduardo Sandoval
 Tres veces Ana (1961)
 Los jóvenes viejos (1962)
 Los inconstantes (1963)
 Pajarito Gómez -una vida feliz- (1965)
 Gente conmigo (1965)
 Extraña invasión (1965)
 ¡Ufa con el sexo! (inédita) (1968)
 Turismo de carretera (1968)
 La fiaca (1969)
 Kuma Ching (1969) ...Sansón
 Todos los pecados del mundo (1972)
 La malavida (1973) ...Simón Linsky
 La Patagonia rebelde (1974) ...Edward Mathews
 La Mary (1974) ... Ariel
 Triángulo de cuatro (1975)
 Más allá del sol (1975)
 La Hora de María y el pájaro de oro (1975)
 Difunta Correa (1975)
 Proceso a la infamia (1978) ... Senador Santana
 Visión de un asesino (no estrenada comercialmente) (1981)
 Made in Argentina (1987)
 Negra medianoche, inédita, (1990)
 Of Love and Shadows (1994)
 De amor y de sombra (Professor Leal), (1995)
 Veredicto final, (1996)
 Momentos robados, (1997)
 Cómplices (Fernando), (1998)
 Apariencias (Esteban Ortiz), (2000)
 Claim (Juan Pasaron), (2002)
 El borde del tiempo (Vicente), (2004)
 Incorregibles, (2007)

 Television 
 Historia de jóvenes (Series TV), 1959
 El ABC del amor (episode "Noche terrible") (1967) ...Ricardo
 Esta noche... miedo (Series TV), 1970
 La única noche (Series TV), 1985
 La elegida (Agustín-Series TV), 1992
 Micaela (Antonio-Series TV), 1992
 Chiquititas (Ramiro Morán-Series TV), 1995
 La mujer del presidente'' (Series TV), 1999
 Don Juan y Su Bella Dama (Francisco-Series TV), 2008
 El elegido (Tomás-Series TV), 2011

References

External links
 
 Cine Nacional

Argentine male film actors
1934 births
Living people
Argentine male stage actors
Argentine activists
20th-century Argentine male actors
21st-century Argentine male actors